Tsingya is a genus of flowering plants belonging to the family Sapindaceae.

Its native range is Madagascar.

Species:
 Tsingya bemarana Capuron

References

Sapindaceae
Sapindaceae genera
Taxa named by René Paul Raymond Capuron